Qaleh-ye Deh Khanjan (also Romanized as Qal‘eh-ye Deh Khānjān) is a village in Dinavar Rural District, Dinavar District, Sahneh County, Kermanshah Province, Iran. At the 2006 census, its population was 85, in 22 families.

References 

Populated places in Sahneh County